Zheng Weishan (August 5, 1915 – May 9, 2000) was a People's Liberation Army lieutenant general and People's Republic of China politician. He was born in Macheng, Hubei Province (his birthplace is now part of Xin County, Henan Province). He was Communist Party of China Committee Secretary of Inner Mongolia.

1915 births
2000 deaths
People's Liberation Army generals from Henan
People's Republic of China politicians from Henan
Chinese Communist Party politicians from Henan
Political office-holders in Inner Mongolia
Commanders of the Lanzhou Military Region
Politicians from Xinyang